Venier is a surname. Notable people with the surname include:

Andrea Venier, castellan of Scutari
Annibale Venier (born 1951), an Italian rower
Anton Venier, Austrian luger
Antonio Venier (c. 1330–1400), Doge of Venice
Cecilia Venier-Baffo (1525-1583), principal consort and later legal wife of Sultan Selim II (supposed Jewish, Greek, Venetian)
Francesco Venier, Doge of Venice
Giacopo Antonio Venier (died 1400), Doge of Venice, called the Cardinal of Cuenca
Giacopo Venier (1422–1479), Italian cardinal
Glauco Venier (born 1963), Italian jazz pianist and composer
Jean-Baptiste Venier (18th-century), French violinist and music publisher 
Mara Venier (born 1950), Italian actress and television presenter
Marco Venier, Lord of Cerigo (died 1311), Lord of Cerigo
Marco Venier, Marquess of Cerigo, Marquess of Cerigo
Marco Venier, Marquess of Cerigo
Marie Dorion Venier Toupin (ca. 1786–1850), Ialian explorer, the only female member of the Pacific Fur Company to the Pacific Northwest in 1810
Marie Venier (c.1590-1627), French actress
Nicolò Venier (ca. 1483–1530), Lord of Paros
Pietro Venier, Governor of Cerigo (died 1372), Governor of Cerigo
Sebastiano Venier (c. 1496–1578), Doge of Venice
Simone Venier (born 1984), Italian rower
Stephanie Venier (born 1993), Austrian World Cup alpine ski racer 
Zuan Francesco Venier (died 1518), Co-Lord of Cerigo

Other uses 
House of Venier, a prominent family in the Republic of Venice

Casa Venier, a small Gothic-style palace in Campo Santa Maria Formosa, in the Sestiere of Castello, Venice, Italy
Palazzo Venier-Manfrin, a Baroque-style palace located facing the Cannaregio Canal in the sestiere of Cannaregio of Venice, Italy
Teatro Venier, prominent in the operatic life of Venice in the 18th and early 19th centuries.